‘Abd Allāh ibn Sa‘īd ibn Sa‘d (‎; d. ) was a sharif of the Zayd clan who was briefly Sharif and Emir of Mecca in May 1770.

His brother Sharif Musa'id gave bay'ah (allegiance) to him before his death as his chosen successor. He assumed the Emirate after Musa'id's death on 27 Muharram 1184 AH and received his investiture from the Qadi of Mecca. However his brother Sharif Ahmad, desiring the Emirate for himself, deposed Abd Allah and appointed himself as Emir. Abd Allah died six years later.

Notes

References

Year of birth missing
1770s deaths
18th-century Arabs
Sharifs of Mecca
Dhawu Zayd